Basanti Tangewali is a 1992 Hindi drama film directed and produced by Kanti Shah, and starring Ekta Sohini, Kader Khan, Sadashiv Amrapurkar and Shakti Kapoor in the key roles.

Plot
The film revolves with the life of Basanti, the Tangawali of legendary Hindi movie Sholay and her tween sister who becomes a dacoit latter.

Cast
 Ekta Sohini as Basanti
 Kader Khan
 Sadashiv Amrapurkar
 Shakti Kapoor
 Dalip Tahil
 Kiran Kumar
 Vijay Saxena
 Avtar Gill
 Ishrat Ali

References

External links
 

1992 films
1990s Hindi-language films
Films scored by Dilip Sen-Sameer Sen
Indian action drama films
Sholay
Films directed by Kanti Shah